UR Chicago is an online magazine covering regional and national lifestyles and entertainment. It was a print magazine between 1997 and 2008.

History and profile
Founded in 1997, UR Chicago was published by Pure Entertainment Group. The magazine was then sold to En Prise Entertainment, LLP, a Chicago-based artist management/event promotion company owned by local tastemakers Chess Hubbard and Matt DuFour. It was published on a monthly basis.

The magazine was free of charge when it was a print publication and focused on nightlife, music, theater, art, film, dining, and fashion, focusing mainly on the Chicago area. It also offered in-depth feature reporting. In September 2008 it became a web-only magazine.

References

External links
UR Chicago official site

1997 establishments in Illinois
2008 disestablishments in Illinois
Entertainment magazines published in the United States
Lifestyle magazines published in the United States
Local interest magazines published in the United States
Monthly magazines published in the United States
Free magazines
Independent magazines
Magazines established in 1997
Magazines disestablished in 2008
Magazines published in Chicago
Online magazines with defunct print editions
Online magazines published in the United States